Guadalupe County is a county located in the U.S. state of Texas. As of the 2020 census, its population was 172,706. The county seat is Seguin. The county was founded in 1846 and is named after Guadalupe River.

Guadalupe County is part of the San Antonio metropolitan statistical area.

History
Indigenous paleo-Indian hunter-gatherers were the first inhabitants of the area, thousands of years before European colonization. Later, historic Indian tribes settled in the area, including Tonkawa, Karankawa, Kickapoo, Lipan Apache, and Comanche.

In 1689, Alonso de Leon named the Guadalupe River in honor of Our Lady of Guadalupe.

The grant was reaffirmed by the Republic of Mexico after it achieved independence.

Following Mexico's independence from Spain, Anglo-Americans from the United States settled in Texas in 1821, and claimed Mexican citizenship. In 1825, Guadalupe County was part of Green DeWitt's petition for a land grant to establish a colony in Texas, which was approved by the Mexican government. From 1827 to 1835, 22 families settled the area as part of DeWitt's colony.

Following Texas' gaining independence from Mexico (1836), 33 Gonzales Rangers and Republic veterans established Seguin. Founded as Walnut Springs in 1838, the settlement's name was changed to Seguin the next year to honor Juan Nepomuceno Seguín, who had fought for independence.

In 1840, the Virginian Michael Erskine acquired the El Capote Ranch for use as a cattle ranch. In 1842, the Republic of Texas organized Guadalupe County as a judicial county. The Texas Supreme Court declared judicial counties to be unconstitutional.

Following the annexation of Texas by the United States (1845),  Prussian immigrant August Wilhelm Schumann arrived on the Texas coast aboard the SS Franziska in 1846, and purchased  in Guadalupe County. Shortly thereafter, the state legislature established the present county from parts of Bexar and Gonzales Counties.

In 1846, during the war between the United States and Mexico, a wagon train of German immigrant settlers bought Guadalupe land from August Schumann. The following year, the town of Schumannsville was established by German immigrants and named after him. Numerous German immigrants entered Texas at Galveston following the revolutions of 1848 in German states, settling in Guadalupe County and central Texas. After their own struggles, they tended to oppose slavery.

The last Indian raid into the area was made by the Kickapoo in 1855.

By 1860,  1,748 slaves of African descent were in the county, generally brought in from the South by slaveholder migrants. In 1861, the people of the county voted 314–22 in favor of secession from the Union. Guadalupe County sent several troops to fight for the Confederate States Army. Following the end of the Civil War and the emancipation of the slaves (1865), a Freedmen's Bureau office opened in 1866 in Seguin to supervise work contracts between former slaves and area farmers. Together, German Americans and African Americans joined the Republican Party, leading Guadalupe County to be a reliably Republican one into the 20th century, even after the state disfranchisement of African Americans in 1901 by imposition of a poll tax.

By 1876, the Galveston, Harrisburg and San Antonio Railway reached Seguin. It was completed as far as San Antonio the following year. By 1880, ethnic Germans accounted for 40% of the county population. Tenant farming and sharecropping accounted for the operation of 25% of the county's farms. By 1910, immigrants from Mexico accounted for about 11% of the country’s population.

In 1929, oil was discovered at the Darst Creek oilfield. By 1930, tenant farming and sharecropping comprised 64% of the county's farms.

Over the next five decades, the economy changed markedly, as the area became more urbanized and less dependent on agriculture. By 1982, professional and related services, manufacturing, and wholesale and retail trade involved nearly 60% of the workforce in the area.

Geography

Major highways
  Interstate 10
  Interstate 35
  U.S. Highway 90
  U.S. Highway 90 Alternate
  State Highway 46
  State Highway 123
  State Highway 130

Adjacent counties
 Hays County (north)
 Caldwell County (northeast)
 Gonzales County (southeast)
 Wilson County (south)
 Bexar County (southwest)
 Comal County (northwest)

Demographics

Note: the US Census treats Hispanic/Latino as an ethnic category. This table excludes Latinos from the racial categories and assigns them to a separate category. Hispanics/Latinos can be of any race.

As of the census of 2000,  89,023 people, 30,900 households, and 23,823 families were residing in the county. The population density was 125 people/sq mi (48/km2). The 33,585 housing units average 47/sq mi (18/km2). The racial makeup of the county was 77.65% White, 5.01% African American, 0.55% Native American, 0.87% Asian,  12.86% from other races, and 3.07% from two or more races. About 33.21% of the population were Hispanics or Latinos of any race.

Of the 30,900 households, 38.30% had children under  18 living with them, 61.60% were married couples living together, 11.20% had a female householder with no husband present, and 22.90% were not families. About 18.90% of all households were made up of individuals, and 7.60% had someone living alone who was 65 or older. The average household size was 2.83, and the average family size was 3.23.

In the county, the age distribution was 28.50% under 18, 9.00% from 18 to 24, 29.10% from 25 to 44, 22.20% from 45 to 64, and 11.30% who were 65  or older. The median age was 35 years. For every 100 females, there were 97.00 males. For every 100 females age 18 and over, there were 94.30 males.

The median income for a household was $43,949, and for a family was $49,645. Males had a median income of $32,450 versus $23,811 for females. The per capita income for the county was $18,430. About 7.30% of families and 9.80% of the population were below the poverty line, including 13.30% of those under age 18 and 9.50% of those 65 or over.

Education

School districts
School districts include:
 Comal Independent School District
 La Vernia Independent School District
 Luling Independent School District
 Marion Independent School District
 Navarro Independent School District
 New Braunfels Independent School District
 Nixon-Smiley Consolidated Independent School District
 Prairie Lea Independent School District
 San Marcos Consolidated Independent School District
 Schertz-Cibolo-Universal City Independent School District
 Seguin Independent School District

Colleges and universities
Most of the county is in the service area of Alamo Community College District. The portion in San Marcos CISD is zoned to Austin Community College.

Texas Lutheran University has about 1,400 students. It is affiliated with the Evangelical Lutheran Church in America. It was ranked number three among the best west regional universities by U.S. News & World Report in 2013. Texas Lutheran is now a member of the Southern Collegiate Athletic Conference, NCAA Division III, with Austin College, Colorado College, Centenary College of Louisiana, Schreiner University, Southwestern University, Trinity University, and the University of Dallas.

Communities

Cities (multiple counties)
 Cibolo (a small portion in Bexar County)
 Luling (mostly in Caldwell County)
 New Braunfels (mostly in Comal County as well as its seat)
 San Marcos (mostly in Hays County and a small part in Caldwell County)
 Schertz (partly in Bexar and Comal  Counties)
 Selma (partly in Bexar and Comal Counties)
 Universal City (mostly in Bexar County)

Cities

 Kingsbury
 Marion
 New Berlin
 Santa Clara
 Seguin (county seat)
 Staples

Census-designated places

 Geronimo
 Lake Dunlap
 McQueeney
 Northcliff
 Redwood
 Zuehl

Unincorporated communities
 Barbarosa
 Clear Springs
 Leesville‡
 Schumansville
 Zorn

Ghost town
 Concrete

Politics
Although not to the same extent as Gillespie or Kendall Counties, Guadalupe is a strongly Republican county that possessed strong GOP leanings even during the Solid South era due to its Texas German heritage. The only Democratic Presidential candidate to carry Guadalupe County since 1940 has been Hill Country native Lyndon B. Johnson during his 1964 landslide; it was one of seven Lone Star State counties to vote for Thomas E. Dewey in 1944 and one of eight to do so in 1948. The only Democrat to reach 40% of the county’s vote since 1968 has been Jimmy Carter in 1976.

Although Al Smith did win the county in 1928 due to anti-Prohibition sentiment, unlike nearby Bandera County, Guadalupe had even leaned Republican before Warren G. Harding's 1920 landslide, voting Republican in every election between 1896 and 1924 except the divided 1912 contest.

Government 
Guadalupe County is run by a commissioners court presided by the county judge.  The court has four members elected for two-year terms. The commissioners are elected by and represent individual districts.  The county judge is elected through a county-wide at-large election.

County judge past and present 
 Donald Schraub (2003 - 2007)
 Michael T. Wiggins (2007 - 2012)
 Larry Jones (2012 - 2014)
 Kyle Kutscher (2014–present)

See also

 List of museums in Central Texas
 National Register of Historic Places listings in Guadalupe County, Texas
 Recorded Texas Historic Landmarks in Guadalupe County

References

External links
 Guadalupe County government's website 
 

 
1846 establishments in Texas
Greater San Antonio
Populated places established in 1846
Majority-minority counties in Texas